Chandozhinskia is a genus of Asian bush crickets belonging to the tribe Meconematini (subfamily Meconematinae). They are found in Indochina and central-southern China.

Species
Both species were previously placed in the genus Xiphidiopsis and are now:
 Chandozhinskia bivittata (Bey-Bienko, 1957) – type species (as Xiphidiopsis bivittata = subspecies bivittata)
 C. bivittata bivittata (Bey-Bienko, 1957) holotype locality: Simao, Yunnan, China
 C. bivittata vietnamica Gorochov, 2011 - Phú Lương District, now in Thái Nguyên Province, Vietnam
 Chandozhinskia hastaticercus (Tinkham, 1936) - China, Vietnam

References

External links
Images of C. bivittata at OSF

Meconematinae
Orthoptera of Asia
Tettigoniidae genera